Type X may refer to:

 Typex, or Type X, British cipher machines used from 1937
 Taito Type X, an arcade system board 
 Type X submarine, a special type of German U-boat
 Grahame-White Type X, a 1910s British passenger-carrying biplane 
 Type X, a category of fire-resistant drywall
 Type-X (unmanned ground vehicle), a robotic combat vehicle by Milrem Robotics

See also

Type 10 (disambiguation)